Explore was a 1980s PBS TV show based upon the film footage filmed by explorer Douchan Gersi over the previous 20 years.  The show was hosted by popular actor James Coburn.

Series Episodes
Once Upon A Time In Afghanistan  (Afghanistan)
In The Foot Steps Of Genghis Khan (Afghanistan)
Land of the Living Gods
Kingdom Beneath The Sky
Lost Road To Nubia (Ethiopia)
Bodies of Art, Bodies of Pandora
Sanctuaries of Stone (Ethiopia)
Land of Sheba (Ethiopia)
Orphans of the Sun
Magic Healing, Magic Death
Wolves of Freedom
Puppets of God
And The Gods Moved to Taiwan
Between Gods & Men
Journal from India
In The Wheels Of Karma
the Last Empire of Sailing
Festival of Tears
Dancers of Evil (Sri Lanka)
Tooth of Buddha (Sri Lanka)
Blue Men of the Sahara
From Timbuktu To The Stars (Burkina Faso)
Kaaba Center of the Universe
Bandits, Pirates, Flying Carpets
Jungles of Borneo (Indonesia)
Headhunters of Borneo (Indonesia)

External links
 Douchan Gersi - Documentary films
 Episode list from LocateTV.com

PBS original programming